Owenbeg is a village and townland in County Sligo, Ireland. It is situated on the N59 national highway section between Ballina, County Mayo, and Sligo Town, near the junction of the road with R297. The name is an anglicisation of the Irish-language words abhainn beag, or "little river", after the river on which it is situated.

The namesake river of the village shares its name with, among others, the Owenbeg Rivers in County Londonderry and County Kerry.

References

See also
 List of towns and villages in Ireland
 List of townlands of County Sligo

Towns and villages in County Sligo
Townlands of County Sligo